The ATP Roller Open was a tennis tournament held in Pétange, Luxembourg since 2012. The event was part of the ATP Challenger Tour and was played on hard courts.

Past finals

Singles

Doubles

References

External links
Official website

 
ATP Challenger Tour
Tennis tournaments in Luxembourg
Hard court tennis tournaments